Hamilton International Film Festival (HUFF) is an annual film festival held in Hamilton, New York. It was established in 2009 and runs usually in first week of August every year in Hamilton Movie Theater. It aims in presenting "the best in new cinema". The film festival was founded by brothers Wade, Grant and Todd Slater, whose father, Terry Slater, was the head hockey coach at Colgate University for 15 years.

References

Film festivals in New York (state)
Tourist attractions in Madison County, New York